Branston Community Academy, (formerly Branston School and Community College) is a secondary school for 11- to 18-year-old students on Station Road in Branston, Lincolnshire, England.

History

Secondary modern school
Building started in 1955, and it was partly opened in January 1957 as Branston County Secondary Modern. It was built by Bosworth & Wakeford of South Parade, Grantham. It was officially opened by the Earl of Ancaster, the Lord Lieutenant, on Friday 5 July 1957.

By 1959 around 350 pupils were enrolled. The name was shortened to Branston County Secondary School in 1968, and to Branston School in 1970. The headteacher was Mr L Kellett, the school was nine acres and cost £99,133, the furniture cost £11,300.

Comprehensive
The name was changed to Branston School and Community College in 1972, and later shortened to Branston Community College.

The original school consisted of a central block of classrooms, which included a dining hall on the ground floor, and a gymnasium. Woodwork and metalwork workshops were built nearby, while sports changing rooms and greenhouses were at the back. The school for many years ran a house system based on royal houses, with allocated colours: Tudor (yellow), Lancaster (red), Windsor (green), Stuart (blue), York (white) and Hanover (orange). This system has since ended.

Classroom space expanded through increased pupil numbers. A new library and office accommodation block, sports complex, swimming pool, fitness centre, youth wing, sixth form unit, science and language block and house rooms have been added over the years.

Today
In December 2010 the school changed its name from Branston Community College to Branston Community Academy.

Branston has previously held Business and Enterprise Specialist status and was one of the first 18 British schools designated as a Specialist Business and Enterprise College in September 2002. In 2003 the school became a DCSF Pathfinder Enterprise School, and in 2006 it was designated as the regional hub school for Enterprise. In 2005 the College set up a four-year partnership with Lincolnshire Cooperative and it has also been asked by the Specialist Schools Trust to take part in the research project, Capturing Transformation.

According to the Lincolnshire County Council website:

The Library has extensive book, non-book and ICT resources and a large area for private study. The Academy has invested heavily in broadband and wireless technology in addition to the several dedicated, networked ICT rooms.

References

External links
 Branston Community Academy- School Website
 BBC Education League Tables – Branston Community College exam results
 Former principal Bruce Douglas on Radio 4

Academies in Lincolnshire
Educational institutions established in 1957
North Kesteven District
Secondary schools in Lincolnshire
1957 establishments in England